Albert (Albert I) (before 1131 – 29 September 1162), Count of Chiny, son of Otto II, Count of Chiny, and Adélaïs of Namur.  He succeeded his father before 1131 and spent most of his time in Chiny, not taking part in the various conflicts which shook the region.

He married Agnes, daughter of Renaud I, Count of Bar and Gisèle Vaudémont, daughter of Gerard, Count of Vaudémont.  Their children were:
 	Louis III, Count of Chiny
 	Thierry (d. after 1207), Lord of Mellier, married Elizabeth
 	Arnulf of Chiny-Verdun (killed in 1181), Bishop of Verdun, 1172–1181
 	Alix (d. after 1177), married to Manasses of Hierges
 	Ida of Chiny, married to Gobert V, Lord of Aspremont (see Fredelon and the House of Esch for a discussion of their descendants)
 	A daughter, mother of Roger Walehem
 	Hughes, married to a daughter of Renaud de Donchéry
 	A daughter, Abbess of Givet.
Arnulf was killed by an arrow to the head in front of the castle of Saint Manehulde during an attack on the bishopric of Verdun.

Alix and Mannases were the parents of Albert II of Hierges, Bishop of Verdun (1186–1208). Ida and Gobert were the grandparents of John I of Aspremont, Bishop of Verdun (1217–1224).

Albert was succeeded as Count of Chiny by his son Louis.

References 
 Arlette Laret-Kayser, Entre Bar et Luxembourg : Le Comté de Chiny des Origines à 1300, Bruxelles (éditions du Crédit Communal, Collection Histoire, série in-8°, n° 72), 1986
Medieval Lands Project, Comtes d’Ivois et Chiny

Herbertien dynasty
1162 deaths
Counts of Chiny
Year of birth unknown
Year of birth uncertain